Alexandros Kyziridis (born 16 September 2000) is a Greek professional footballer who plays as an attacking midfielder for NB I club Debrecen.

References

2000 births
Living people
People from Skydra
Footballers from Central Macedonia
Greek footballers
Greek expatriate footballers
Association football midfielders
Iraklis Thessaloniki F.C. players
Volos N.F.C. players
FC ViOn Zlaté Moravce players
Football League (Greece) players
Super League Greece players
Slovak Super Liga players
Expatriate footballers in Slovakia
Greek expatriate sportspeople in Slovakia